Long intergenic non-protein coding RNA 637 is a protein that in humans is encoded by the LINC00637 gene.

References

Further reading